Goliath at the Conquest of Damascus is a 1965 Italian peplum film directed by Domenico Paolella.

Plot 
The king of the Kurds has kidnapped the daughter of the king of Baghdad to blackmail him. Goliath is sent to the rescue.

Cast 

 Peter Lupus: Goliath (credited as Rock Stevens) 
 Mario Petri: Yssour 
 Helga Liné: Fatma 
 Arturo Dominici: Kaichev 
 Piero Lulli: Thor 
 Anna Maria Polani: Myriam 
 Marino Masé: Phir 
 Daniele Vargas: Saud 
 Mino Doro: King Selim 
 Andrea Aureli: Bhalek 
 Nello Pazzafini: Horval 
 Dario Michaelis: Safawidi

Release
Goliath at the Conquest of Damascus was released on 3 March 1965.

See also
  List of Italian films of 1965

Footnotes

References

External links

1965 films
Films directed by Domenico Paolella
Peplum films
1960s adventure films
Films set in the Middle Ages
Films set in the Middle East
Films with screenplays by Ernesto Gastaldi
Films scored by Angelo Francesco Lavagnino
Sword and sandal films
Goliath
1960s Italian films